Frédérik Edouard Robert "Fred" Deburghgraeve (born 1 June 1973 in Roeselare) is a former Belgian swimmer who won the gold medal in the 100 m breaststroke and set a world record during the 1996 Olympic Games in Atlanta, Georgia. He is now retired from swimming and makes a living as a salesman.  He lives in Roeselare. Deburghgraeve was trained by a Dutchman, named Ronald Gaastra.

In 2008 Deburghgraeve was inducted in the International Swimming Hall of Fame.

See also
 List of members of the International Swimming Hall of Fame

References

1973 births
Living people
People from Roeselare
Belgian male breaststroke swimmers
Olympic swimmers of Belgium
Olympic gold medalists for Belgium
Swimmers at the 1992 Summer Olympics
Swimmers at the 1996 Summer Olympics
World record setters in swimming
World Aquatics Championships medalists in swimming
European Aquatics Championships medalists in swimming
Medalists at the 1996 Summer Olympics
Olympic gold medalists in swimming
Sportspeople from West Flanders